Baciato dalla fortuna is a 2011 Italian comedy film directed by Paolo Costella. It is based on the Vincenzo Salemme's comedy play Fiore di ictus.  The film debuted at the second place on the Italian box office chart.

Cast 
Vincenzo Salemme: Gaetano Peccerella 
Nicole Grimaudo: Grazia Tirelli
Asia Argento: Betty
Dario Bandiera: Nicola 
Alessandro Gassman: Silvano Grandoni 
Isabelle Adriani: Clara  
Elena Santarelli: Virginia 
Maurizio Casagrande: Impiegato Banca

See also   
 List of Italian films of 2011

References

External links

2011 films
2011 comedy films
Italian comedy films
2010s Italian-language films
2010s Italian films